North Carolina's 111th House district is one of 120 districts in the North Carolina House of Representatives. It has been represented by Republican House Speaker Tim Moore since 2003.

Geography
Since 2023, the district has included part of Cleveland and Rutherford counties. The district overlaps with the 44th and 48th Senate districts.

District officeholders since 2003

Election results

2022

2020

2018

2016

2014

2012

2010

2008

2006

2004

2002

References

North Carolina House districts
Cleveland County, North Carolina
Rutherford County, North Carolina